Adidas Stan Smith is a tennis shoe made by Adidas, and first launched in 1965. Originally named "Adidas Robert Haillet" after the brand endorsed French prominent player Robert Haillet, in 1978 the sneakers were renamed after Stan Smith, an American tennis player who was active between the end of the 1960s and the beginning of the 1980s. 

The shoe, usually made with a white leather upper and laces, has a simple design. Unlike most Adidas shoes, it does not have the external three stripes. Instead there are three rows of perforations (or punched ventilation holes) on both sides of each shoe's leather upper. There is sometimes a sketched picture of Stan Smith on the tongue of the shoe. In some sense, the Adidas branding is minimal on the shoe. The design and form of the shoe has basically stayed the same since it was introduced, but several new versions and colorways have appeared during the years.

History

Origins 

In 1963, the first Adidas tennis shoe was produced, which was the first ever leather tennis shoe and marked the beginning of a long line of classic Adidas shoes. The upper part of the shoe is made of white leather, whereas the pimpled outer sole is made of rubber. The inner sole is made of synthetic material. It was Horst Dassler, the son of Adolf "Adi" Dassler – the founder of Adidas, who had the idea of the first leather tennis shoe. In 1965, this tennis shoe model was named the adidas Robert Haillet after the French tennis professional Robert Haillet. When Haillet retired from tennis, Adidas and Horst Dassler decided to find another tennis player that could endorse the tennis shoe model. Donald Dell, an American tennis manager, suggested Stan Smith, who took the offer in order to obtain royalties for the use of his name. For Adidas, the shoe became a market opener in the United States. In 1967, a green foam padding was added at the back of the shoe for Achilles tendon protection.

Stan Smith 
In 1973, Stan Smith signed a contract with Adidas. According to Sneaker Report, this contract is on 13th place of the 50 most influential sneaker sponsorships in sports history. For some reason, Adidas could not decide at first if the model should still be called Robert Haillet or if it should be renamed to Stan Smith, so for several years (1973–1978) the shoe was produced with a tongue that had Stan Smith's portrait and the word Haillet written above it. In 1978, the word "Haillet" was removed from the tongue, and the shoe was endorsed by Stan Smith and officially renamed the Adidas Stan Smith.

1980s to 2000s 

By 1988, about 22 million pairs of adidas Stan Smith shoes had been sold, and the shoe was listed in Guinness World Records.
By 1994, the number of pairs sold had increased to 23.7 million.

At the turn of the 21st century, Adidas re-issued a new version of the shoe – Adidas Stan Smith II. In 2008, a replica of the original Adidas Stan Smith was released in the Adidas Originals line and was named Adidas Stan Smith 80s. In total, the Adidas Stan Smith has sold over 30 million pairs worldwide since 1971.
There is even a source that claims that Adidas has sold 40 million pairs of the Adidas Stan Smith by 2005.

During a November 17, 2009 interview that aired on The Tony Kornheiser Show, former tennis pro and sports agent Donald Dell said the original Stan Smith green-tab shoe has been in production since 1972, and generated more than US$65 million in revenue in 2008. Dell added during the same interview that the shoe is now available in eight versions, and the model is the biggest-selling tennis shoe ever.

2010s 
Complex Sneakers placed the Stan Smith at number 4 in its list of the 50 greatest tennis sneakers of all time, with the Robert Haillet model in 36th place. ShortList Magazine listed it among the 10 greatest sneakers made. Neal Heard, author of the sneaker cultural history Trainers, placed it 6th in his list of the top 10 sneakers of all time.

Despite its enormous success, Adidas briefly stopped production of the shoe in 2011. It was put back into production in 2014.

Summary of the development of the Adidas Stan Smith 

Summary of the development of the Adidas Stan Smith:
 1963–1964: Not marked as Haillet, no green foam padding, no logo on the tongue
 1965–1966: Marked as Haillet, no green foam padding, no logo on the tongue
 1967–1973: Marked as Haillet, green foam padding, no logo on the tongue
 1974–1977:
 Marked as Haillet, green foam padding, Adidas trefoil logo on the tongue
 Marked as Haillet, green foam padding, Stan Smith's portrait and signature on the tongue
 Marked as Haillet, shape and material of the green foam padding changed and the Adidas trefoil logo and the text Stan Smith, Stan Smith's portrait and signature on the tongue
 1978–early 1980s: Marked as Stan Smith, green foam padding with the Adidas trefoil logo and the text Stan Smith, Stan Smith's portrait and signature on the tongue
 Early 1980s–present: Marked as Stan Smith, green foam padding with the Adidas trefoil logo and the text Stan Smith, a new logo with Stan Smith's portrait (without one of his trademarks – his moustache) and signature on the tongue. 1980s versions had long cylinders (about 10mm) in the sole: worning, it became thinner, warping here and there; newer versions have shorter cylinders (about 2mm), then worning sole become flat and breaks.

Versions 
There are several different versions of the Adidas Stan Smith. Most commonly, they are white with grass-green heel. but there are also other colorings. Since the mid-1990s, some versions come with velcro straps instead of laces.

Most common versions 
The most common versions of the Adidas Stan Smith are:

 Adidas Stan Smith: This is the classic version of the Adidas Stan Smith. This version has a thin tongue with Stan Smith's sketched portrait and his signature, the back of the shoes has a (normally grass-green) part with the Adidas trefoil logo and the text Stan Smith under the logo, and the inner sole has a printed pattern consisting of the text Adidas and the trefoil logo. In addition, the inner of the shoes is unlined. Note that the original model version numbers of the Adidas Stan Smith were FAF1028 (or just AF1028) for grass-green and AF1365 for blue, where the digit 1 indicated that it was made in France. Later numbers were 032853 and 034685. M20324 (white/green), M20325 (white/blue), M20326 (white/red): skin upper and lining; OrthoLite® insole.
 Adidas Stan Smith II: This version has a thick tongue without Stan Smith's portrait and signature. Instead there is a part of fabric with the text Adidas Stan Smith. At the back of the shoes there is only the Adidas trefoil logo. The inner sole is white with a single print of the word Adidas and the Adidas trefoil logo. The inner of this version is lined. Some of the model version numbers were G17079, G17076, G17077, G10778, G10780, and G10781.
 Adidas Stan Smith 80s: This version is a replica of the version Adidas Stan Smith. However, it has an oldschool or retro touch. Compared with the original version, this version (912305) has a yellowed outer sole, yellowish laces, the leather upper of the shoes is not pure white (known as neowhite), and the color of the heel parts is called fairway green. Note that this version also exists in at least two other colorings: white/navy-blue (G01976) and nubuck black with white outer soles (G01965).

Less common versions 
Rare versions of the Adidas Stan Smith:
 Adidas Stan Smith Millennium (659910, 073158): This is an updated version of the classic Adidas Stan Smith, which has the same three perforation "stripes", but has the new Adidas logo instead of the Adidas trefoil logo. In addition, the outer sole is thicker and the tongue is thick as on the Stan Smith II. It comes in white and navy blue, but the classic coloring of white and green also exists. The shoe has a lightweight design.
 Adidas Stan Smith I LG (670461, 670460, 385855): This version is the same as the original, except that the words Stan Smith are printed on the side of the leather upper.
 Adidas Stan Smith Supreme (519514, 519516, 552286, 552288)

Limited editions 
Limited editions of the Adidas Stan Smith include:

 Adidas Stan Smith Comfort: This version is a velcro edition of the classic Adidas Stan Smith.
 Adidas Stan Smith Slim (012981)
 Adidas Stan Smith Vintage (807446, 465265, 561622): This version has a sketched portrait of Stan Smith etched in gold on the tongue.
 Adidas Stan Smith Vintage "Crafts Pack" (G13247)
 Adidas Stan Smith Vintage "Drawings Pack" (G00236)
 Adidas Stan Smith Vintage Smith vs. Nastase (749187)
 Adidas Stan Smith Vintage Tournament Edition (018090): This version is a white quality leather shoe with a forest green heel tab and black and the same green in the inner lining. Two tennis rackets and the words Tournament Edition are etched in gold on the tongue.
 Adidas Stan Smith Herzogenaurach Sportschuhe Limited Edition (G03132)
 Adidas Stan Smith I Graph (919420)
 Adidas stan smith II Beach Pack (G19151)
 Adidas Stan Smith II Blue Suede (G43716)
 Adidas Stan Smith II Camouflage (046189)
 Adidas Stan Smith II City Series: Brussels (013614), Las Vegas (013616), Rio de Janeiro (013619), and Seville (013623).
 Adidas Stan Smith II Coast To Coast (071328)
 Adidas Stan Smith II Cope2 (653435)
 Adidas Stan Smith II x Def Jam (G06112)
 Adidas Stan Smith II "End To End"
 Adidas Stan Smith II "End To End" Kings
 Adidas Stan Smith II x Fafi (G19858)
 Adidas Stan Smith II Fleece (G19844)
 Adidas Stan Smith II Geisha (G00402)
 Adidas Stan Smith II Ghostface Killah (G06073)
 Adidas Stan Smith II Greens++
 Adidas Stan Smith II Kermit the Frog (562898)
 Adidas Stan Smith II Lea (099841)
 Adidas Stan Smith II Logo (163143)
 Adidas Stan Smith II Lovers
 Adidas Stan Smith II Mahogany (G50871)
 Adidas Stan Smith II Mammoth Pack
 Adidas Stan Smith II Mesh (561362)
 Adidas Stan Smith II Method Man (G06071)
 Adidas Stan Smith II Miss Piggy (465574)
 Adidas Stan Smith II Mr Happy (562900)
 Adidas Stan Smith II Nubuck (034098)
 Adidas Stan Smith II OctoGlows
 Adidas Stan Smith II Paintballers (G04516)
 Adidas Stan Smith II Pool Ball (077525)
 Adidas Stan Smith II Rime (017221)
 Adidas Stan Smith II x Russ
 Adidas Stan Smith II Seasons Greetings (G04034)
 Adidas Stan Smith II x Scien
 Adidas Stan Smith II x Scien x 123Klan x "End To End" (017180)
 Adidas Stan Smith II Smart (915050)
 Adidas Stan Smith II x Sole Brother x Custom City Series: Miami & Amsterdam
 Adidas Stan Smith II Star Wars (G16801)
 Adidas Stan Smith II Trimm Dich (562896)
 Adidas Stan Smith II United States (G50869)
 Adidas Stan Smith II x Upper Playground x AESOP ROCK (663744)
 Adidas Stan smith II x Upper Playground x David Choe (663742)
 Adidas Stan Smith II Weave (654231, 654228)
 Adidas Stan Smith II x Young Jeezy (Snowman) x Def Jam (G06072)
 Adidas Stan Smith II Comfort: This is a velcro edition of the Adidas Stan smith II.
 Adidas Stan Smith II Comfort Betty Boop (465564)
 Adidas Stan Smith II Comfort x Fafi (G15416)
 Adidas Stan Smith II Comfort Sport Goofy (562899)
 Adidas Stan Smith II Comfort Tron (562897)
 Adidas Stan Smith II Smart One "End To End" (017202)
 Adidas Stan Smith II Velcro Pack
 Adidas Stan Smith II Strap (G12511, G12512, G12513, G12514, G13893)
 Adidas Stan Smith 80s – Star Wars Edition – Master Yoda (G12434)
 Adidas Stan Smith 80s – Star Wars Edition – Millennium Falcon (G17360)
 Adidas Stan Smith 80s – Star Wars Edition – Wampa (G51612): Or is this an adidas Campus shoe?
 Adidas Stan Smith 80s Mid – Star Wars Edition – Darth Vader (G46195)
 Adidas Stan Smith 80s Mid – Star Wars Edition – Imperial Guard (G41817)
 Adidas Stan Smith 80s Mid Casual (G16684, G16683)
 Adidas Stan Smith 80s Mid x 10.Deep "Raw Dogs" (G12909)
 Adidas Stan Smith 80s Mid Iridescent (G42848)
 Adidas Stan Smith 80s TF (G19265)
 Adidas Stan Smith 80s x ACU x D-Mop (G14579, G14579-1)
 Adidas Stan Smith 80s "BBU" – Beauty & Youth United Arrows x Bedwin & The Heartbreakers x Undefeated (U42971, U42972)
 Adidas Stan Smith 80s Clay/Aloe (G02955)
 Adidas Stan Smith 80s x Five-Two 3 City Artist Pack x KRSN (G18295)
 Adidas Stan Smith 80s Graphite (912320)
 Adidas Stan Smith 80s Outdoor (G50877, G50876)
 Adidas Stan Smith 80s x maharishi (G14102)
 Adidas Stan Smith 80s x ObyO x Kazuki x JAM HOME MADE (G43979, G43978)
 Adidas Stan Smith 80s Lux – Stingray (G44883)
 Adidas Stan Smith 80s Lux – Zebra (G16625)
 Adidas Stan Smith 80s Lux Comfort – Denim
 Adidas Stan smith 80s x Diesel (G46072)
 Adidas Stan Smith 80s Mid x Diesel (Y00304)
 Adidas Stan Smith 80s A.R.C. (Alife Rivington Club) (G00954): This version has an off-white all-canvas upper.
 Adidas Stan Smith 80s DHug (G14839)
 Adidas Stan Smith 80s Lite Zip (G44153, G44158)
 Adidas Stan smith x Undefeated x BAPE
 Adidas Stan Smith 2.0 "Grey Patent" (G43717)
 Adidas Stan Smith 2.5 (666356, 016959, 016963, 280686, 280696)
 Adidas Stan Smith 2.5 Comfort (017032, 280701, 666391, 666407)
 Adidas Stan Smith Mid x Hellboy II (G04664)
 Adidas Stan Smith Lotus Logo (G19250, G19251, G19252)
 Adidas Stan Smith x Swarovski
 Adidas Stan smith x Yohji Yamamoto x "Yohji Smith" (V24938)
 Adidas Stan Smith Skate (044032, 044033, 466435, 466437, 466440, 466443): This is a skateboard edition of the adidas stan smith.
 Adidas SB Stan Smith x Ewan Hecox (946015)
 Adidas Stan Smith Skore (075702)
 Adidas Stan Smith JS (Jeremy Scott) Bowling (G50731)
 Adidas Stan Smith Jeremy Scott ObyO JS Slim Glow in the Dark (G61706)
 Adidas Stan Smith Remodel (G13241, G13242, G23143, G13943)
 Adidas Stan Smith Lite (G44497, G44496, G44494)
 Adidas Stan Smith Lite CQ (G44070, G44069, G44072, G44071)
 Adidas Stan Smith II Lite CQ (G16547, G16548)
Adidas Stan Smith Leather Sock 
 Adidas Stan Smith x Stella McCartney: first vegan sneakers

Countries of production 
The Adidas Stan Smith originally was manufactured in Landersheim in north-eastern France by Adidas France that was initiated by Horst Dassler. However, since the production of the Adidas Stan Smith started, the shoe has been produced in several countries. Among the various countries are Algeria, Canada, China, Czechoslovakia, France, Germany, Hungary, India, Indonesia, Morocco, Portugal, Spain, South Korea, Taiwan, USA and Vietnam.

For tennis 
Today, the Adidas Stan Smith is not recommended for tennis players, but the shoe continues to be an iconic and stylish model for sneaker fans in general and for old school and retro tennis shoe fans in particular. To non-tennis fans, Stan Smith is probably better known for the shoe than for his past career as a tennis player.

Sneaker collectors 
For some sneaker collectors, the most sought-after vintage Adidas Stan Smith are the early versions of the shoe. The ones made in France are considered to be highly valuable.

Sneaker art 

For some time, people have been drawing or painting on their sneakers using ink, markers or spray cans. Young people have made this kind of art with various motifs ranging from simple drawings to more complex graffiti paintings. Probably due to its often white color, the Adidas Stan Smith has been used as an object for sneaker art. For example, many artists and design studios hand-paint Stan Smith sneakers and sell them as art.
Concerning signed adidas stan smith sneakers, it is possible to find them with Stan Smith's autograph with black marker ink on the white leather upper.

In fact, in 1983, Adidas launched the concept of Adicolor, where sneakers were sold along with the tools to customize them. The Adicolor sneakers are all white sneakers specifically created for the Adicolor concept. In 2005, Adidas re-launched Adicolor as a replica of the original from 1983. There have been some Adicolor versions of the Stan Smith. The Sport Goofy, Kermit the Frog, Miss Piggy, Mr Happy, Trimm Dich, Comfort Betty Boop, Comfort Tron, and Velcro Pack versions of the shoe also belong to the Adicolor series. Besides painting, other sneaker art has been performed with the Adidas Stan Smith. In 2008, Adidas Originals started a collaboration with American fashion designer Jeremy Scott. He has designed a couple of different versions of the Stan Smith such as JS Bowling and JS Slim Glow in the Dark.

References

External links

 

Adidas
Sneaker culture
Products introduced in 1965